Suleyman Valiyev (1916, Absheron, Ramana – 1996 Baku) was an Azerbaijani writer.

References 

Azerbaijani writers
Translators to Azerbaijani
1916 births
Year of death missing
1996 deaths